João Fragoso (27 April 1913 – 28 December 2000) was a Portuguese painter. His work was part of the painting event in the art competition at the 1948 Summer Olympics.

References

1913 births
2000 deaths
20th-century Portuguese painters
Portuguese male painters
Olympic competitors in art competitions
People from Caldas da Rainha